Voskhod is a rural locality (a village) in Tardavsky Selsoviet, Belokataysky District, Bashkortostan, Russia. The population was 66 as of 2010. There is 1 street.

Geography 
Voskhod is located 32 km west of Novobelokatay (the district's administrative centre) by road. Munasovo is the nearest rural locality.

References 

Rural localities in Belokataysky District